Charaxes angelae, the Angela's demon charaxes, is a butterfly in the family Nymphalidae. It is found in Ivory Coast, Ghana and possibly Sierra Leone. The habitat consists of tropical evergreen forests.

References

External links
Images of C. angelae  Royal Museum for Central Africa (Albertine Rift Project)
Charaxes angelae images at Consortium for the Barcode of Life 
African Butterfly Database Range map via search

Butterflies described in 1975
angelae